Bula, officially the Municipality of Bula (Rinconada Bikol: Banwaān ka Bula; Tagalog: Bayan ng Bula), is a 1st class municipality in the province of Camarines Sur, Philippines. According to the 2020 census, it has a population of 73,143 people.

History
The town of Bula is historically considered as one of the first four mission towns of Camarines Sur founded by the Spanish conquistadores when they set foot on the Bicol soil coming from the Visayas in 1576. The other premier towns were Naga, Quipayo and Nabua.

The Spaniards who first came to this place asked the men who were splitting bamboos about the name of the place, and since they did not understand the language, they thought that they were being asked about the name of the bamboo, and so they got the answer "Bu-la". And so Bula became the name of the town.

However, it was only in 1578 when the natives where Christianized, so the National Historical Commission dates back the town's history to 1578. From this, the town chose St. Mary Magdalene as its patron saint and celebrates its fiesta every 22nd day of July, which is the birthdate of the saint.

Geography
Bula is bounded on the north by the municipalities of Pili and Ocampo, on the east by the municipality of Baao, on the southeast by the Municipality of Nabua, on the south it is bounded by the Municipality of Balataan, on the southwest by Ragay Gulf, and on the west by the Municipality of Minalabac.

Barangays
Bula is politically subdivided into 33 barangays.

Climate

Demographics

Language
Majority of the people speak the Bula-Pili variant, a lowland dialect (sinaranəw) of Rinconada Bikol language, also known as Riŋkonāda. The population can also understand and speak Tagalog or Filipino language and English.

Religion
Majority of the population are Roman Catholic members which is the biggest bulk of Bulaeños adhering to Christian faith. The rest of population are followers of different Protestant denominations.

Economy 
Despite staying as a 2nd class municipality, the LGU has been making a couple of improvements in the past few years. This is because there are some areas that need improvement of infrastructures. This also makes Bula a 1st class municipality.

Agriculture

Products:

Rice, Wheat, Coconut, Corn

Commercial and Industrial is mostly focused on the Centro area such as the Bula Public Market.

Tourism
The town of Bula is the home of the breathtaking views of Tan-Awan Park, Nalalata Falls, and Burabod. Tan-Awan Park, located in Barangay Bagoladio atop a hill, attracts a number of tourists because of its captivating view overlooking the areas of its neighboring towns in Rinconada.

Bula is also home to beaches on its easternmost side, neighboring Minalabac in the north and Balatan to the south.

Gallery

References

External links

 [ Philippine Standard Geographic Code]
Philippine Census Information
Official Site of the Province of Camarines Sur

Municipalities of Camarines Sur
Metro Naga